Pachnoda sinuata, the garden fruit chafer or 
checkers tor or
brown-and-yellow fruit chafer, is a species of beetle found in Namibia and South Africa.

Subspecies
 Pachnoda sinuata calceata Harold, 1878
 Pachnoda sinuata flaviventris (Gory & Percheron, 1833)
 Pachnoda sinuata machadoi Rigout, 1989
 Pachnoda sinuata nicolae Rigout, 1986
 Pachnoda sinuata sinuata (Fabricius, 1775)

Identification
The species is part of the large family Scarabaeidae, which also include the scarabs and dung beetles. This species is large with a smooth carapace. Colouration is variable but basically yellow with dark brown central area broken by yellow spots and a transverse yellow line across the rear of the elytra.

Diet
Adult beetles feed on flowers and fruit, often destroying them in the process which makes them unpopular with gardeners. While commonly found on exotic plants like roses and camellias, these beetles also feed on a range of indigenous plants including Acacia.

Breeding
Adults lay their eggs in manure and compost heaps or among plant roots. The pupae develop inside large, egg-shaped protective clay shells.

Biology
This species is a popular prey species for many species of bird, such as red-winged starlings and hadada ibises.

Habitat
It ranges widely in South Africa and thus are found in a variety of habitats. They are commonly found in gardens.

Gallery

References

 Picker, Griffiths & Weaving - Field Guide to Insects of South Africa (Struik 2002) 
 Rigout (J.), 1989, The Beetles of the World, volume 9, Sciences Nat, Venette

External links

 Montreal Insectarium
  Pachnoda sinuata flaviventris in Biolib

Cetoniinae
Beetles of Africa
Beetles described in 1775
Taxa named by Johan Christian Fabricius